USS Lewis has been the name of more than one United States Navy ship, and may refer to:

, a sailing ship of 308 tons, purchased 20 October 1861 for use in the Stone Fleet
, a destroyer escort in commission from 1944 to 1946

See also

United States Navy ship names